Kelland O'Brien (born 22 May 1998) is an Australian racing cyclist, who currently rides for UCI WorldTeam . O'Brien qualified for the 2020 Tokyo Olympics and was part of the Men's team pursuit together with Leigh Howard, Sam Weisford and Alexander Porter. They secured a bronze medal after overlapping New Zealand who had crashed. O'Brien also competed in the Men's Madison where the team finished fifth with a time of 3:48.448 and therefore did not qualify for the final.

Biography 
O'Brien grew up in Kew, Victoria, Australia. He started in BMX but then switched to mountain bike. O'Brien also did quite a bit of road cycling before concentrating on the track. He represented Australia at the 2015 Junior World Championships and his performances allowed him to get a Madison gold and Team Pursuit bronze. 
 
O'Brien rode in the men's team pursuit event at the 2017 UCI Track Cycling World Championships. In December 2017, he was awarded Australian Institute of Sport Emerging Athlete of the Year.

Major results
2017
 UCI Track World Championships
1st  Team pursuit
3rd  Individual pursuit
2018
 1st  Team pursuit, Commonwealth Games
 2nd Six Days of London (with Leigh Howard)
2019
 4th Time trial, National Under-23 Road Championships
 10th Halle–Ingooigem
2020
 2nd Time trial, National Under-23 Road Championships
2021
 National Road Championships
2nd Road Race
3rd Time trial
 3rd  Team pursuit, Olympic Games
2022
 7th Dwars door Vlaanderen

Grand Tour general classification results timeline

References

External links

1998 births
Living people
Australian male cyclists
Cyclists from Melbourne
UCI Track Cycling World Champions (men)
Cyclists at the 2018 Commonwealth Games
Commonwealth Games medallists in cycling
Commonwealth Games gold medallists for Australia
Australian track cyclists
Olympic cyclists of Australia
Cyclists at the 2020 Summer Olympics
Medalists at the 2020 Summer Olympics
Olympic bronze medalists for Australia
Olympic medalists in cycling
People from Kew, Victoria
Medallists at the 2018 Commonwealth Games